Sistan and Baluchestan Province is the second largest province of the 31 provinces of Iran, after Kerman province, with an area of 180,726 km2. It is in the southeast of the country, bordering Pakistan and Afghanistan, and its capital is the city of Zahedan.

At the time of the National Census of 2006, the province had a population of 2,349,049 in 468,025 households. The following census in 2011 counted 2,534,327 inhabitants living in 587,921 households. At the most recent census in 2016, the population had increased to 2,775,014 in 704,888 households.

The Baloch form a majority of the population and the Persian Sistani a minority. Smaller communities of Kurds (in the eastern highlands and near Iranshahr); the expatriate Brahui (on the border between Iran and Pakistan); and other resident and itinerant ethnic groups, such as the Romani, are also found within the province.

History

In the epigraphs of Bistoon and Persepolis, Sistan is mentioned as one of the eastern territories of Darius the Great. The name Sistan, as mentioned above, is derived from Saka (also sometimes Saga, or Sagastan), a Central Asian tribe that had taken control over this area in the year 128 BC. During the Arsacid Dynasty (248 BC to 224 AD), the province became the seat of Suren-Pahlav Clan. From the Sassanid period until the early Islamic period, Sistan flourished considerably.

During the reign of Ardashir I of Persia, Sistan came under the jurisdiction of the Sassanids, and in 644 AD, the Arab Muslims gained control as the Persian empire was in its final moments of collapsing.

During the reign of the second Sunni caliph, Omar ibn Al-Khattab, this territory was conquered by the Arabs and an Arab commander was assigned as governor. The famous Persian ruler Ya'qub-i Laith Saffari, whose descendants dominated this area for many centuries, later became governor of this province. In 916 AD, Baluchestan was ruled by the Daylamids and thereafter the Seljuqids, when it became a part of Kerman. Dynasties such as the Saffarids, Samanids, Qaznavids, and Seljuqids, also ruled over this territory.

In 1508 AD, Shah Ismail I of the Safavid dynasty conquered Sistan, and during the reign of Nader Shah, there was further turmoil.

Geography 
The whole of the province had been previously called Baluchestan, but the government added Sistan to the end of Baluchestan. After the 1979 revolution, the name of the province was changed to Sistan and Baluchestan.

Today, Sistan refers to the narrow strip of the northern margin of the province and Baluchestan stretches north to south from Zahedan County to Chabahar County. The province borders South Khorasan province in the north, Kerman province and Hormozgan province in the west, the Gulf of Oman in the south, and Afghanistan and Pakistan in the east.

Sistan and Baluchestan province is one of the driest regions of Iran, with a slight increase in rainfall from east to west, and a rise in humidity in the coastal regions. The province is subject to seasonal winds from different directions, the most important of which are the 120-day wind of Sistan, known in Baluchi as Levar; the seventh wind (Gav-kosh); the south wind (Nambi); the Hooshak wind; the humid and seasonal winds of the Indian Ocean; the north wind (Gurich); and the western wind (Gard).

Administrative divisions

Cities 

According to the 2016 census, 1,345,642 people (over 48% of the population of Sistan and Baluchestan province) live in the following cities: Adimi 3,613, Bampur 12,217, Bazman 5,192, Bent 5,822, Bonjar 3,760, Chabahar 106,739, Dust Mohammad 6,621, Espakeh 4,719, Fanuj 13,070, Galmurti 10,292, Gosht 4,992, Hiduj 1,674, Iranshahr 113,750, Jaleq 18,098, Khash 56,584, Konarak 43,258, Mehrestan 12,245, Mirjaveh 9,359, Mohammadabad 3,468, Mohammadan 10,302, Mohammadi 5,606, Negur 5,670, Nik Shahr 17,732, Nosratabad 5,238, Nukabad 5,261, Pishin 16,011, Qasr-e Qand 11,605, Rask 10,115, Saravan 60,014, Sarbaz 2,020, Shahr Ali Akbar 4,779, Sirkan 2,196, Suran 13,580, Zarabad 4,003, Zabol 134,950, Zahedan 587,730, and Zehak 13,357.

The following table shows the ten largest cities of Sistan and Baluchestan province:

Demographics 

Most of the population are Balōch and speak the Baluchi language, although there also exists among them a small community of speakers of the Indo-Aryan language Jadgali. Baluchestan means "Land of the Balōch"; Sistan represents the minority who speak the Sistani dialect of Persian.

Religion
The minority Sistani people of Sistan and Baluchestan province are Shia Muslims, and the majority Baloch people of the Baluchestan area in the province are Sunni Muslims specially Deobandis.

Sistan and Baluchestan today

Sistan and Baluchestan is the poorest of Iran's 31 provinces, with a HDI score of 0.688.

The government of Iran has been implementing new plans such as creating the Chabahar Free Trade-Industrial Zone.

Economy 

Industry is new to the province. Efforts have been done and tax, customs and financial motivations have caused more industrial investment, new projects, new producing jobs and improvement of industry. The most important factories are the Khash cement factory with production of 2600 tons cement daily and three other cement.

Factories under construction:
 Cotton cloth and fishing net weaving factories and the brick factory can be named as well.

The province has important geological and metal mineral potentials such as chrome, copper, granite, antimony, talc, manganese, iron, lead, zinc, tin, nickel, platinum, gold and silver.

One of the main mines in this province is Chel Kooreh copper mine in 120 km north of Zahedan.

Sistan embroidery has been an ancient handicraft of the region that has been traced as far back as 5th-century BC, originating from the Scythians.

Transportation

Road transport

National rail network
The city of Zahedan has been connected to Quetta in Pakistan for a century with a broad gauge railway. It has weekly trains for Kovaitah. Recently a railway from Bam, Iran to Zahedan has been inaugurated. There may be plans to build railway lines from Zahedan to Chabahar.

Airports

Sistan va Baluchistan Province has two main passenger airports:
 Zahedan Airport
 Chabahar Airport (Konarak Airport)

Ports
Port of Chabahar in south of province is the main port to be connected by a new railway to Zahedan in future. India is investing on this port. The port stands on Coast of Makran and is 70 km in west of Gwadar, Pakistan.

Higher education 
 University of Sistan and Baluchestan
 Chabahar Maritime University
 Zabol University
 Islamic Azad University of Iranshahr
 Islamic Azad University of Zahedan
 Zahedan University of Medical Sciences
 Zabol University of Medical Sciences
 International University of Chabahar
 Velayat University of Iranshar
 Jamiah Darul Uloom Zahedan
Landmarks such as the Firuzabad Castle, Rostam Castle and the Naseri Castle are located in the province.

See also
 Bazman, volcano mountain
 Baloch people
 Sistan region
 Balochistan region
 Balochistan, Afghanistan
 Balochistan, Pakistan

References

Bibliography

External links

Official website of Sistan and Baluchestan Governorship
Chabahar Free Trading Zone, Sistan and Baluchistan

 
Balochistan
Balochi-speaking countries and territories
Provinces of Iran
Gulf of Oman